The discography of Eufonius, a progressive pop rock band from Japan, consists of 18 studio albums, 1 compilation album, 27 singles, and 1 music video. Eufonius' vocalist Riya and keyboardist Hajime Kikuchi originally produced independent music individually, but after a chance meeting on the Internet in 2003, the two formed Eufonius. The duo independently released their self-titled debut album Eufonius (2003) at the M3 dōjin music convention, followed by their independently released debut single "Guruguru" (2004) also at M3. Eufonius made their major debut on King with their second single "Habataku Mirai" (2004), which appeared on their major debut album Subarashiki Sekai (2006). "Habataku Mirai" was the first release by Eufonius to chart on the Japanese Oricon charts, peaking at No. 80. The band's highest charting single is "Hiyoku no Hane" (2010), which peaked at No. 16.

Eufonius has continued to release independent albums and singles even after their major debut, as with their albums Eufonius+ (2005) and Σ (2007). The band released their second major album Metafysik (2007) on Lantis, followed by two more independent albums—Metro Chrome (2008) and Nejimaki Musica (2009). Eufonius released their eighth album Ao no Scape (2009) on GloryHeaven (attached to Lantis), which peaked at No. 55 on the Oricon albums chart, making it their most successful album to date. An independent, follow-up album for Nejimaki Musica titled Nejimaki Musica 2 was released in April 2010. Eufonius released three albums in 2011: their independent album Bezel, Aletheia released on Team Entertainment, and Phonon released on GloryHeaven. Eufonius' next two albums were independently released: Nejimaki Musica 3 (2012) and Frasco (2014). Eufonius released their 15th album Kioku Seizu (2014) on Lantis. Eufonius released their compilation album Kalyteryz in 2015 on Lantis. Eufonius released their independent albums Noesis in 2015, Sorafuruhate in 2016, and Phols in 2021.

Albums

Studio albums

Compilation albums

Singles

Collaborations

Music videos

Other album appearances

Soundtracks

Various artist compilation albums

Other video album appearances

Notes and references
 These albums and singles were released independently.

General

Specific

External links
Eufonius' official website 

Discographies of Japanese artists
Rock music group discographies